Lalbarra, alternatively Lalburra is a small town and serves as headquarter of Lalburra tehsil. It is a tehsil (sub-district) of Balaghat district in the state of Madhya Pradesh, India. It is located on State Highway 26, on the edge of Pench National Park. Its Postal Index Number is 481441.

Schools
Schools in Lalbarra Tehsil include:
Golden Valley Public School
Educare Public School
Oriental English Higher Secondary School
Vaidik Convent School
Vivek jyoti gyan pith
Excellence school
Vidhya Sagar
Navin Bharti vidhya pith

Transportation 
Lalbara is well connected to nearby towns like Balaghat, Garra, Wara Seoni, Katangi, Lamta, and Seoni. It is also directly connected to cities like Jabalpur, Bhopal , Indore and Nagpur via bus routes.The nearest airport is Jabalpur.

Attractions 
 Dhuty Dam
 Tekadi Talab
 Sonewane jungle - Tekadi
 Potiapaat wainganga river
 Sai mandir Bakoda
 Bomblai Devi

References

Villages in Balaghat district
Cities and towns in Balaghat district